Jacob Bicker (Amsterdam 1588–1647) was a Dutch patrician and merchant. Between 1643 and 1647 he was lord of Engelenburg and a director of the Oostzeevaart, handling Dutch trade with the Baltic Sea.

Life

Born in Amsterdam, he was a son of Gerrit Bicker and his wife Aleyd Andriesdr Boelens. He was a member of the Bicker family, a major trading family involved in the pelt trade with Muscovy and supplying ships and silver to Spain. Bicker married Christina de Graeff (1609–1679), daughter of Jacob Dircksz de Graeff and of Aaltje Boelens Loen.

Jacob Bicker was one of the richest people of the Dutch Golden Age and was estimated to have a fortune of 220,000 guilders in 1631. In 1643 Jacob Bicker inherited the castle and estate of Engelenburg near Herwijnen from his relative Pieter Dircksz Graeff. In the 1640s Jacob Bicker belonged to the Bickerse ligue, which opposed Stadholder Frederick Henry, Prince of Orange. Among his other posts, he held that of Schepen of Amsterdam. In 1647 he died in Amsterdam, shortly before the death of his brother Andries Bicker.

Besides some lands in 's-Graveland and Gooilust, Bicker also owned country houses in Baarn, Soest, Bilthoven and Hollandsche Rading buitenhuizen: 'De Eult', 'Pijnenburg', Gooilust and Kasteel de Hooge Vuursche.

References

Sources
  Zandvliet, Kees, De 250 rijksten van de Gouden Eeuw. Kapitaal, macht, familie en levensstijl (2006 Amsterdam; Nieuw Amsterdam Uitgevers), p. 73
  Engelenburg in de Ebidat – Burgendatenbank des Europäischen Burgeninstitutes

17th-century Dutch people
1588 births
1647 deaths
Jacob
Dutch businesspeople